Belle Poule is a French Navy schooner in service as a training vessel, and the fourth ship of that name in the French Navy. She was built in 1932 as a replica of a cod fishing vessel used off Iceland, as a training ship of the students of the École navale. During the Second World War, Belle Poule sailed to the United Kingdom after the Fall of France and was used by the Free French Naval Forces, returning to Brest in 1945. The schooner as well as her sister ship  are still used by the École Navale as training ships in European waters.

Design and construction
In the early 20th century, the French Navy scrapped its aging traditional sailing ships,  in 1904, and Borda in 1914. In the following years, it emerged that student officers would benefit from at least some sailing training. Since it would consist only in short cruises around Brest rather than long cruises, the school decided not to build a three-masted ship. Instead, it chose a replica of a cod fishing schooner, which had the advantage of being both maneuverable, and strong enough to sustain the weather of the winter around Brest. in 1931, the Ministry of the Navy ordered two such ships, as to allow enough of the students to embark at the same time. The first was Belle Poule, and the second, .

The Navy ordered the ships from Chantiers de Normandie at Fecamp. Construction was supervised by Lieutenant Richard for the Navy, and engineers Chantelot and Lemaistre for the shipyard. The ships could accommodated 30 student officers, 5 petty officers 12 seamen and 3 officers. Construction of Belle Poule began in late July 1931, and she was launched on 8 February 1932.

During her trials, Belle Poule managed  on engines. With sails, she achieved  close-hauled and  broad reach.

Characteristics 

Belle Poule is a replica of a type of fishing vessel that was used until 1935 off Iceland for catching cod.

The propeller has only two blades, and can be stopped and locked vertically, as not to hinder the nautical qualities of the hull.

As a former ship of the Free French Naval Forces (French: Forces Navales Françaises Libres, or FNFL), Belle Poule still flies the flag with the Cross of Loraine in honour of her role during the Second World War.

Career
From September 1932 Belle Poule and Étoile served with the École navale in their normal role. 

In the morning of 18 June 1940, Lieutenant-Commander Cros, in charge of both schooners, was ordered to prepare for evacuating the students of the school in the face of the German invasion. By 1400, both ships were manned, and they departed at 1500. At 1700, they had joined Président-Théodore-Tissier, Jean-Frédéric and Notre-Dame-de-France. The ships crossed the English Channel during the night, and arrived at Falmouth on 19 June around 1700.  

The British boarded Belle Poule in the night of 2 July as part of Operation Catapult, taking the French personnel prisoner. They restituted the ships to the FNFL on 20 September. Both ships were demagnetised as a precaution against mines, and armed with two  Hotchkiss Mle 1914 machine guns.  

On 16 November 1940, Belle Poule and Étoile left Falmouth and sailed to Portsmouth to join the Free French naval school, held on Président-Théodore-Tissier. On 18 November, they came under attack from a bomber, but the four bombs that it released fell hundreds of metres away and did not cause damage. 

From November 1940, Belle Poule sailed each day of the week to train gunners, helmsmen, gabiers and commandos for the FNFL and for the Royal Navy, with Ensign Walmeyer acting as a liaison officer. Because she was moored next to the battleship , Belle Poule was regularly under attack from German planes.   On 10 January 1941, she sustained two hits from incendiary bombs, and an officer, Blonsard, was seriously wounded fighting the fire. King George VI and Queen Elizabeth paid the ships a visit, and Blonsard was awarded the Croix de Guerre for saving Belle Poule.  

On 15 April 1944, Belle Poule and Étoile departed for West Hartlepool, Étoile towing Belle Poule for most of the journey due to an engine failure. They arrived on 13 May and were placed in reserve. 

In late September 1945, Belle Poule and Étoile returned to Brest. From October they were appointed to the École navale again, but were in such bad condition that they stayed under refit until mid-1947. Their engines were replaced with  Deutz AG engines taken from German trucks.

Belle Poule and Étoile now sail around Brest during the winter, and occasionally participate in meetings during the summer, mainly in European waters. In 1975, they had a refit, and the engines were replaced with  Baudoin DNP8.  In 2009, they crossed the Atlantic to New York.

Since 13 May 1978 Belle Poule has been sponsored by the city of Pauillac. Belle Poule underwent a refit in 2006.

References

Bibliography

External links
 
 

Cold War auxiliary ships of France
Ships of the Free French Naval Forces
Ships built in France
Individual sailing vessels
Sail training ships
Schooners of the French Navy
World War II auxiliary ships of France
1932 ships
Replica ships